The Caribbean Football Union Women's Caribbean Cup is an international tournament for the women's national teams of the Caribbean Region.

History
It first took place in 2000 and was later re-introduced in 2014. The 2014 edition was used as the Caribbean zone qualification competition for the 2014 CONCACAF Women's Championship.

In 2018, the CFU Women's Challenge Series was launched by the Caribbean Football Union, where 20 teams were divided into five groups. There is no overall champion, and medals are awarded to each group winner and runner-up.

Results

References 

 
Caribbean Football Union
International association football competitions in the Caribbean
Women's international association football competitions
Recurring sporting events established in 2000
2000 establishments in North America